Son-in-Law (22 April 1911 – 15 May 1941) was a British Thoroughbred racehorse and an influential sire, especially for sport horses.

The National Horseracing Museum says Son-in-Law is "probably the best and most distinguished stayer this country has ever known." 

Described as "one of the principal influences for stamina in the modern thoroughbred" in Ulbrich's Peerage of Racehorses, Son-in-Law is seen in the pedigree of many of the top 100 show jumpers, particularly those of Holstein heritage.

In 1924 and 1930, Son-in-Law was the leading sire in Great Britain and Ireland. His progeny include:
 Foxlaw (1922-1935) - won 1927 Ascot Gold Cup
 Straitlace (f. 1921) - won 1924 Epsom Oaks, Coronation Stakes
 Rustom Pasha - extremely important sire in Argentina
 Suzerain (f. 1933) - third in 1937 Jockey Club Cup, Doncaster Cup
 Trimdon (f. 1926) - won 1931-32 Ascot Gold Cup

References
 Detailed profile of Son-in-Law at Thoroughbred Heritage
 Son-in-Law's pedigree and partial racing stats
 Son-in-Law's profile at the National Horseracing Museum, Newmarket
 Ulbrich's Peerage of Racehorses

1911 racehorse births
1941 racehorse deaths
Sport horse sires
Racehorses trained in the United Kingdom
Racehorses bred in the United Kingdom
British Champion Thoroughbred Sires
Thoroughbred family 5-d
Chefs-de-Race